Pat Conway (1931–1981) was an American actor.

Pat Conway, Patricia Conway, or Patrick Conway may also refer to:

 Pat Conway (politician) (born 1947), American politician
 Patricia Conway (architect), American architect
 Patricia Conway (archer) (born 1944), British Olympic archer
 Patrick Conway (1865–1929), American bandleader
 Patrick H. Conway (born 1974), American physician